Florentius of Carracedo was Benedictine abbot at Carracedo, Spain, who was held with great regard by King Aiphonsus VII of Leon and Castile, Spain. His monastery adopted the Cistercian rule, after the death of Florentius, in 1156.

Notes

Spanish Roman Catholic saints
12th-century Christian saints
1156 deaths
Spanish Benedictines
Spanish abbots
Year of birth unknown